A colonial agent was the official representative of a British colony based in London during the British Empire.  About 200 men served. They were selected and paid a fixed salary by the colonial government, and given the long delays in communication, they played a major role in negotiating with royal officials, and explaining colonial needs and resources.  Their main business was with the Board of Trade, where the agent dealt with land problems, border disputes, military affairs, and Indian affairs.  They provided the British officials with the documents and news, secured acceptance of controversial colonial legislation, and tried to head off policies objectionable to the colonies.  They handled the appeal cases, which usually went to the Privy Council. Before 1700 a colony would send occasional special agents on a temporary basis. Thus Rhode Island sent John Clarke in 1660 to secure a Royal charter; it took two years, and then he returned.  Permanent agents became the practice after 1700; most were Americans but some were British.  Many of the agents worked together 1730-1733 to oppose a bill establishing a monopoly in West Indian rum, sugar and molasses. 

The most famous agent was Benjamin Franklin, who was employed for 15 years by Pennsylvania, and also by Georgia, New Jersey, and Massachusetts.  Others include Richard Jackson, a prominent London lawyer who represented Connecticut, and Charles Pinckney who represented South Carolina.

In 1768, the colony of Georgia hired Franklin, who was already Pennsylvania's colonial agent.  Franklin favored Georgia's lower house, to the annoyance of the upper house and royal governor. He cut back his work for Georgia after 1771, because the colony was delinquent in paying his fees.<ref> David T. Morgan, "A New Look at Benjamin Franklin as Georgia's Colonial Agent," Georgia Historical Quarterly, Summer 1984, Vol. 68 Issue 2, pp 221-232</ref> 

William Samuel Johnson, a Connecticut lawyer, was known in the 1760s as a colonial rights. As the colonial agent for Connecticut he sharply criticized British policy toward the colonies. His experience in London in 1767 convinced him that Britain's policy was shaped more by ignorance of American conditions and not through the sinister designs of a wicked government, He felt that the American Revolution was not necessary and that independence would be bad for everyone concerned.

Other countries
In southern Ethiopia, Amhara colonial agents in the 19th century were known as neftenya.

References
 Appleton, Marguerite. "Richard Partridge: Colonial Agent," New England Quarterly Vol. 5, No. 2 (Apr., 1932), pp. 293-309 in JSTOR
 Bond Jr., Beverley W. "The Colonial Agent as a Popular Representative," Political Science Quarterly Vol. 35, No. 3 (Sep., 1920), pp. 372-392 in JSTOR
 Lonn, Ella. The Colonial Agents of the Southern Colonies (U of North Carolina Press, 1945)  online edition 
 Morgan, David T. The Devious Dr. Franklin, Colonial Agent: Benjamin Franklin's Years in London (1996)
 Hoffman, Ross J. S. Edmund Burke, New York Agent: With His Letters to the New York Assembly and Intimate Correspondence with Charles O'Hara, 1761-1776 (American Philosophical Society, 1956)  online edition 
 Tanner, Edwin P. "Colonial Agencies in England During the Eighteenth Century," Political Science Quarterly'' Volume 16, Number 1 (Mar., 1901), pp. 24-49 in JSTOR

Notes

 
Thirteen Colonies